Operation Able Warrior was conducted by Task Force Baghdad soldiers in the early-morning hours of 4 August 2005 to defeat terror cells operating west of the Baghdad International Airport.  The mission of Operation Able Warrior was to disrupt car-bombing cells and those that place roadside bomb, and prevent them from planning, preparing and carrying out terrorist attacks in the area.  The purpose of the mission was to aid the Iraqi Security Forces in the area in their day-to-day operations, and to secure the perimeter of the Baghdad International Airport.

In less than three hours, soldiers from 2nd Battalion, 121st Infantry Regiment, 48th Brigade Combat Team, 3rd Infantry Division, conducted a series of simultaneous attacks and captured 41 suspected terrorists, including three foreign fighters.
The mission fulfilled its parameters, and was considered to be a success.

Military units involved
US forces reported to be involved were
2nd Battalion, 121st Infantry Regiment, 48th Brigade Combat Team, 3rd Infantry Division

Casualties
No US casualties were reported during the operation.

References

External links
 Defense Link
 Global Security
 Multi-National Force – Iraq

Military operations of the Iraq War in 2005
Military operations of the Iraq War involving the United States